Toral is a given name. Notable people with the name include:

José Toral y Velázquez (1832–1904), Spanish Army general 
Toral Rasputra (born 1987), Indian television actress